Let Love Rule may refer to:

 Let Love Rule (Archie Roach album) or the title song, 2016
 Let Love Rule (Ledisi album) or the title song, 2017
 Let Love Rule (Lenny Kravitz album), 1989
 "Let Love Rule" (song), the title song
 Let Love Rule, a reality dating show format developed by ITV Studios, broadcast in the UK as The Cabins